Marlies Oostdam (born 29 July 1977 in Haarlem, Netherlands) is a football (soccer) player who represented New Zealand at international level. She emigrated from the Netherlands to New Zealand in 1985.

Oostdam made her full Football Ferns debut in a 0–3 loss to Australia on 24 March 1996, and represented New Zealand at the 2007 FIFA Women's World Cup finals in China, where they lost to Brazil (0–5), Denmark (0-2) and China (0-2).

Oostdam was also included in the New Zealand squad for the 2008 Summer Olympics where they drew with Japan (2-2) before losing to Norway (0-1) and Brazil (0-4).

Oostdam formally played for Melbourne Victory in the Australian W-League.

References

External links
 

1977 births
Living people
New Zealand women's association footballers
New Zealand women's international footballers
Olympic association footballers of New Zealand
Footballers at the 2008 Summer Olympics
Melbourne Victory FC (A-League Women) players
Expatriate women's soccer players in Australia
Footballers from Haarlem
Dutch emigrants to New Zealand
Women's association football defenders
2007 FIFA Women's World Cup players